Ice hockey tournaments have been staged at the Universiade since 1962. The men's tournament was introduced at the 1962 Winter Universiade. The women's tournament was introduced at the 2009 Winter Universiade.

Medal winners 
Men

Women

Medal table 
Last updated during the 2023 Winter Universiade

References 
Sports123

 
Sports at the Winter Universiade
Universiade